Simpals (in English is spelled "sim-pals") - is a group of Moldovan companies that provide online services.  Simpals has a large animation studio.

Simpals is the leader of the online advertising market in Moldova. The Simpals portals reaches almost 75% of the Moldovan internet. Simpals made the first online video broadcast in Moldova and was the first company to sponsor a marathon in Moldova.

Today Simpals has about 160 employees.  The Founder and CEO is Dmitri Voloshin and the CEO is Roman Shtirbu.

Operations

Web portals 
As of 2020, Simpals owned 19 portals.  Simpals web platforms are visited by approximately 1.3 million unique visitors per month (over 70% of all internet users from Moldova).

Online advertising 
In 2011, Simpals had 48% market share of online advertising

Animation and computer graphics 
The Simpals animation studio portfolio includes over 100 video ads and 6 short animations, one of which was designed in VR. In 2008, the company started work on the 3D animation film  "The Gipsy". In 2010, Simpals opened a computer graphics and animation school: “The School of Monsters”.

Social activity 
In 2014 Simpals launched an art project, called: Chisinau Is ME. In 2015, together with Sporter,md, Simpals organized the first Chisinau International Marathon. In 2017, Simpals created: Verde.md.

Venture investment; 
In 2011, Simpals launches the first venture incubator – "Simpals Garage".

Hardware 
In 2016, Simpals created the first freediving weight system: Lobster Neck Weight.In 2019, Garage - Simpals startup project - initiated a new product: Sonr, which is an underwater walkie-talkie for swimmers and coaches.

The company's customers include tOrange Moldova, Moldcell, Nestle, British American Tobacco-Moldova, «Microsoft — Moldova, «Moldtelecom, Efes Vitanta Moldova Brewery (EVMB), Lafarge», Kraft Foods, Хортица, Audi, Volkswagen, Finlandia Vodka, Procter & Gambel, President.

History

2002
On April 1, 2002 Simpals was registered in Chisinau by Dmitri Voloshin.  On November 14, 2002 Simpals moved into a new office. The company had 4 employees. The job market – Joblist.md was launched. As part of the MTV Music Awards 2002, Simpals received the award for best special effects in the music video created for "O-Zone" band.

2003
At the "WebTop 2003" contest, Simpals received 2 awards for economic development of the  999.md site. Due to the company's growth, Simpals moved into a new office. The staff included 9 employees. The automotive portal – Drive.md was launched.

2004
Simpals created a social networking platform Yes.md, which became some kind of symbiosis between online games and modern social networks. Forum.md became the Internet Project of the Year in Moldova and received the award with the same title during the International Youth Day, celebrated in Chişinău.

2005
On March 23, Simpals moved into a new office. The number of employees increased to 48 people.  The daily chat was launched on Yes.md.  As part of the "Tineretul în acţiune" (Youth in action) program, Yes.md website received the title of the Internet project of the year in Moldova.

2006
On April 1, 2006 the company launched the Point.md platform – an information resource in Moldova. The portal was the official partner of Yandex Company in its regional program.

2007
Simpals launched  Play.md – the first online television in Moldova. The portal broadcast both own news materials made by a team of professional journalists and alternative video versions of the events filmed and posted by the users of the portal.  Simpals finalized the platform Colegi.md. The portal became a Moldovan social network.

2008
In 2008, Simpals began to work on the production of the first Moldovan 3D animated film "Ţiganul" (The Gipsy).  Simpals created the PointMessenger 2.0 software, which synchronized all services of the company’s interactive sites. The software was an analogue of ICQ. On December 21, 2008 Simpals moved into a new office. The number of employees reached 62 people.

2009
In 2009, Simpals launched the "999" online shop, which allowed Moldovan Internet users to shop online. The online map of Moldova point.md/Map was updated. The new map was created together with "INGEOCAD"- the State Institute of Geodesy, Engineering Research and Cadastre. Simpals added the dynamic map – point.md/Map to the Point.md portal, so that the internet users could freely access the most detailed map of Moldova. Simpals worked on the music video for the song "Hora din Moldova" performed by Nelly Ciobanu, who represented Moldova at Eurovision – 2009.     Simpals animation studio produced 3 short 3D animated films, two of them   being dedicated to New Year, and the third one-  – April Fool’s Day.

2010
Simpals moved into a new office. The number of employees reached 71 people.  In 2010, Simpals opened "The School of Monsters" (MONSTERS.MD – the school of animation and computer graphics). Simpals opened a representative office of the International Mafia Game Club (MAFIA.MD).

2011
In 2011, Simpals launched the real estate agency – Imobil.md .  Simpals launched the first venture incubator of startups in Moldova – "Simpals Garage". The "Simpals Garage" startup incubator became a co-organizer of the "Startup Weekend Moldova".   Simpals launched Numbers.md – the first internet sales house in Moldova.

2012
Simpals launched a unified login system SimpalslD for all Simpals websites The social project "StopHam Moldova" began its activity.  The company launched Point Money Mobile Currency Converter for IOS devices.  Simpals launched a new section on the first Moldovan video-hosting site play.md - "Video Channels".  999.md won the gold award at the contest "Trademark of the Year" in the category "Favorite".

2013
In 2013, Simpals opened a sports portal and, under the auspices of the business incubator "Simpals Garage", the portal "marry.md". The animated film "Dji. Death fails" produced by Simpals Animation Studio won awards at various film festivals. The Point Money mobile application was adapted for Android operating system. 999.md won the silver award at the contest "Trademark of the Year" in the category "Favorite".  The company launched Point Map mobile application for Android devices. Simpals launched the 999.md mobile app for IOS and Android devices.

2015
Simpals launched an online price comparison service 999 Market aimed at promoting Moldovan producers. Simpals launched Play Live, a mobile app for online streaming. The animated films "Dji. Death fails" and " Dji. Death sails" produced by Simpals Animation Studio " received awards at animation festivals and got more than 1 million views each on the popular video-hosting website youtube.com.

2016
999.md, expanded to Transdniestria. Sporter.md launches the first online platform for manufacturers and sportswear, Sporter Market.Point Map cartographers have added detailed maps for all the district centers in the Republic of Moldova.  Point.md portal launches the map navigation system.

2017
Simpals company launched a new project, in collaborative development with the government - Achizitii.md. This is an online platform for all tenders in the country, for commercial agents, both public and private.

Simpals company launched a new project - Verde.md, with the aim of restoring the green spaces that have suffered from the weather. With city residents' participation, in the first planting stage held in autumn, over 400 trees were planted in Chisinau.

1 July, Afisha project in cooperation with 999.md as well as other co-organizers in the person of MS-Prod and Media Show Grup, held the third edition of the electronic music festival in Moldova, FOSFOR, which set a new record in event attendance, having gathered 24,000 spectators.

Under the auspices of 999.md project, 999 Master is launched – a referral specialist service.

2018
Simpals company has become a resident of the first IT park in Moldova.  Dmitrii Volosin is decorated with state distinction for contribution to the development of sport - the Civic Merit.  In April sports organization Sporter organized for the first time the Music and Sport Festival Hai Haiduci! In September, the sports organization Sporter organizes for the first time in Moldova a marathon with a number of 18,000 participants. In November, Simpals is set up in a new office.

2019 
Afisha.md project launched the tickets delivery system throughout the whole country. In May, Simpals SRL became one of the founders of the Association of Electronic Industry Companies (ACEM).Map.md project started adding 3D objects on the Moldova map.

In fall, Simpals launched a new project: Studii.md. It is an online system of students’ agendas and gradebooks. During the first few months, the project was implemented in 15 schools of Moldova.

In addition, Garage, the company's development department, announced the beginning of work on the new product: Sonr.pro - the smallest underwater communicator for coaches and divers, which aimed to improve the training sessions. This product was included in the list of 7 projects selected by the Starta Accelerator (Starta Ventures Group) (New York, USA).

The most popular Moldovan online ads board, 999.md, celebrated 20 years of working on the market. Monthly, over 2 millions of users find and offer products and services on 999.md.The 999 application for Android OS was ranked on the second place among the free Moldovan apps.  Verde.md project planted over 2,000 trees and bushes during this year.

In December, Simpals was successfully certified to the ISO 9001: 2015 and 27001: 2008 standards.

2020 
In January, ARIPI, the animated movie created by Simpals Studio, finished its festival period, and later was made available to the public.

In connection with the events associated with COVID-19 pandemic and the switching of schools of the Republic of Moldova to distance learning, the Studii.md project started expanding opportunities by transforming the platform of electronic diaries and grade books into a complete system for distance learning. As a result, Studii.md entered the list of platforms that are recommended for distance learning by the Ministry of Education, Culture and Research of the Republic of Moldova. By the end of 2020, 111 schools were connected to the platform.

Simpals joined the new advisory committee of the ATIC Association dedicated to discussing and resolving issues in the financial sector in Moldova.

During the quarantine period in Moldova, the 999.md project joined the national initiative #staiacasa and supported local producers and farmers by giving them the ability to post ads for free on the website. In addition, the project helped doctors find free housing next to work, and helped people exchange services for free in the "Mutual Aid in Quarantine" category. Together with Joblist, 999.md created a free urgent search service for employees during quarantine.

The Garage project helped the non-profit initiative group Visors produce visors (protective masks for doctors). The Sporter project, supported by volunteers, transformed snorkeling masks into protective masks for doctors.

In July, the Simpals company launched a service for the exchange and storage of electronic documents — ID.md.

With the support of UNICEF, USAID and WHO, the women’s forum mama.md and the non-governmental organization Forum released a broadcast in real time — "aLIVE", in which experts answer questions from the audience.

The Map.md and 999.md projects joined the national tourism relaunch campaign #Neampornit #Protejați. A new category appeared on the map, which includes the main tourist attractions in Moldova with an option to add new places to the map. A special subcategory was added to 999.md dedicated to the promotion of domestic tourism.

The Indoor Mapping feature appeared on the Map.md map. In September, Garage announced the launch of a new startup, Aheel — a device for runners that can teach them to run safely and without trauma. In September, Stiri.md became the most read news resource in Romanian, according to data provided by Gemius.

In 2020, the cartoon “Aripi” entered the Forbes TOP-50 VR debuts of 2019, participated in 28 festivals and won 9 awards. It also became the first Moldovan cartoon to be released on the Steam platform.  Simpals Studio released a series of social sketches treating environmental issues — “The Ocean”, “The Harvest”, “The Flat”. “The Flat” participated in 36 festivals and won 2 awards. The Studio was also engaged in the production of a social video about children with Down syndrome.

Projects
 999.md
 pay.md
 point.md
 stiri.md
 map.md
 votum.md
 profi.md
 forum.md
 tigan.md
 simpals.studio
 monsters.md
 garage.md
 lobsterweight.com
aheel.run
 sonr.pro
 numbers.md
 play.md
 drive.md
 mafia.md
 joblist.md
 colegi.md
 mama.md
 imobil.md
 sporter.md
 ftrm.md
 marathon.md
 seamile.md
 winerun.md
 criterium.md
 freediving.md
 craciun.md
 hellrun.md
 puzzleday.md
 glodiator.md
 haiduc.md
 rubicon.run
 triumph.md
 chisinau.me
 verde.md
 afisha.md
 fosfor.md
 price.md
 achizitii.md
id.md
 joblist.md
 studii.md
 banzai.md
 gsm.md
 point IM
 999 market
 smsmarket.md
 yes.md

Filmography

2009
Baro and Tagar
Gypsy and Death

2010
Santa and Death

2012
Dji. Death fails

2014
Dji. Death sails

2019
ARIPI
2020

 The Ocean
 The Harvest
 The Flat

Awards and Distinctions

Social activities

 "Мальчикам и девочкам посвящается" (Dedicated to the boys and girls) – a social project developed by Simpals to help orphans from Moldovan orphanages. (2006, 2007, 2011).
 "Wерни Wетеранам Wеру " (Give Faith to Veterans) – a social project for veterans developed by Simpals in partnership with Forum.md portal. The projects exists since 2005.
 The social project "StopHam Moldova" in partnership with forum.md exists since 2012 with the consent from the organizers of the Russian StopXam movement.
 * Chisinau Is Me project aims to transform turban architecture into independent urban art.
 Verde.md project aims to renew the green spaces of Chisinau and Moldova.

Educational activities
 "School of Monsters" – the school of animation and computer graphics. (MONSTERS.MD).

References

External links
 Official website
 Simpals Garage helps you transform your idea into a successful business moldova.startupweekend.org 
 Moldovan Animation Studio Brings Death to Life!
 An interview with the makers of Death Sails
 Making of Dji. Death Sails
 Making of Dji. Death Fails

Animation studios
Companies of Moldova